Castletown is the name of several places in County Cork in Ireland, including:
 Castletown Berehaven (or Castletown-Bearhaven), a port town in West Cork also known as Castletownbere.
 Castletown-Kinneigh, or Baile Chaisleáin Chinn Eich, a small village in the townland of Castletown in the civil parish of Kinneigh in inland South West Cork
 Castletown, Castletownroche, a townland in the civil parish of Castletownroche in inland North Cork
 Castletown, Kinure, a townland in the civil parish of Kinure, near Oysterhaven on the southern coast of Cork
 Castletown, Mogeely, a townland in the civil parish of Mogeely in inland East Cork

See also
 Castletown (disambiguation)

References 

Geography of County Cork